Calameae is a palm tree tribe in the subfamily Calamoideae. The type genus is Calamus and many of its members are rattans.

Genera 
 Calamus (synonym Daemonorops)
 Calospatha
 Ceratolobus
 Eleiodoxa
 Korthalsia
 Metroxylon
 Myrialepis
 Pigafetta
 Plectocomia
 Plectocomiopsis
 Pogonotium
 Retispatha
 Salacca

See also 
Rattan

References

External links 

 
Monocot tribes